Supersisters was a set of 72 trading cards produced and distributed in the United States in 1979 by Supersisters, Inc.  They featured famous women from politics, media and entertainment, culture, sports, and other areas of achievement.  The cards were designed in response to the trading cards popular among children in the US at the time, which mostly featured men.

The cards were created by Lois Rich of Irvington, New York and her sister Barbara Egerman of Ridgefield, Connecticut, a teacher, librarian, and founder of the Ohio chapter of the National Organization for Women.  They conceived of the cards in 1978, after Rich's young daughter asked her why there were no women on trading cards.  Rich also discovered that students at a local elementary school could not name five famous women.  Rich and Egerman received a small grant from the New York State Education Department and wrote to nearly 500 prominent American women in various fields.  They purposely did not contact a number of notable women, including Anita Bryant, Angela Davis, Phyllis Schlafly, and the cast of Charlie's Angels. Jane Fonda, Betty Ford, Rosalynn Carter, and Ella T. Grasso were among those who did not respond or declined to participate.

  Of those who did respond, they included the first 72 in the trading card set, including Jane Pauley, Margaret Mead, and Gloria Steinem.  By 1981, they reported that they had sold 15,000 trading card sets, selling many to schools and colleges.

Reaction to the cards was largely positive, though some later critics called the cards "misguided" and "trivial".
Sets of the trading cards are in the collections of the Museum of Modern Art and the University of Iowa library.

References

External links 
 Supersisters trading cards at Iowa Digital Library
Trading cards
Feminism in the United States
Products introduced in 1979